Qwabe is a surname of Zulu origin. Notable people with the surname include:

 Mziwamadoda Qwabe, South African man convicted for the Honeymoon murder
 Ntokozo Qwabe (born 1991), South African Rhodes scholar

Zulu-language surnames